Ceylonosticta is a genus of damselfly in the family Platystictidae. Some authors consider some species to be in the genus Drepanosticta. Three new species were described from Sri Lanka in late 2016 with a rediscovery of Ceylonosticta subtropica. The World Odonata List describes 21 species.

Species
The genus includes the following species:

 Ceylonosticta adami
 Ceylonosticta alwisi
 Ceylonosticta anamia
 Ceylonosticta austeni
 Ceylonosticta bine
 Ceylonosticta brincki
 Ceylonosticta digna
 Ceylonosticta hilaris
 Ceylonosticta inferioreducta
 Ceylonosticta lankanensis
 Ceylonosticta mirifica
 Ceylonosticta mojca
 Ceylonosticta montana
 Ceylonosticta nancyae
 Ceylonosticta nietneri
 Ceylonosticta rupasinghe
 Ceylonosticta submontana
 Ceylonosticta subtropica
 Ceylonosticta tropica
 Ceylonosticta venusta
 Ceylonosticta walli

References

Platystictidae
Zygoptera genera
Taxa named by Frederic Charles Fraser